Uncial 0166 (in the Gregory-Aland numbering), is a Greek uncial manuscript of the New Testament, dated paleographically to the 5th century.

Description 
The codex contains a small parts of the Acts of the Apostles 28:30-31 (recto); James 1:11 (verso), on the fragment of one parchment leaf (5 cm by 7.4 cm). The text is written in two columns per page, 28 lines per page, in small uncial letters.
It has breathings and accents.

The fragment contains 9 lines with 99 letters from 219 original. 

Kurt Aland the Greek text of this codex  placed in Category III.

History 

Currently it is dated by the INTF to the 5th century.
The manuscript was found in Egypt. It is the last uncial manuscript added to the list of New Testament manuscripts by Gregory.

The codex currently is housed at the University of Heidelberg (Pap. 1357) in Heidelberg.

See also 

 List of New Testament uncials
 Textual criticism

References

Further reading 

 A. Deissmann, Die Septuaginta-Papyri und andere altchristliche Texte. Veröffentlichungen aus der Heidelberger Papyrus-Sammlung, (Heidelberg: 1905), p. 85.

External links 

 Uncial 0166 at the Heidelberger Papyrus-Sammlung

Greek New Testament uncials
5th-century biblical manuscripts